Chitkara University may refer to one of two universities in India:

 Chitkara University, Himachal Pradesh
 Chitkara University, Punjab